Pedro Portocarrero may refer to:
Pedro Portocarrero (archbishop) (died 1526), Spanish Roman Catholic archbishop
Pedro Portocarrero (bishop) (died 1600), Spanish Roman Catholic bishop 
Pedro Portocarrero (footballer) (born 1977), Colombian football player